May is an English feminine given name. It is derived from the name of the month, which comes from Maia, the name of a Roman fertility goddess. The name May is also used as a pet form of Mary and Margaret.

People
May Allison (1890–1989), American actress
May Allison (runner) (born 1964), Canadian runner
May Arida (1926–2018), Lebanese socialite
May Arslan (1928–2013), member of the Lebanese Arslan family
May Chow, Canadian chef
May Gibbs (1877–1969), Australian children's author and illustrator
May Golan (born 1986), Israeli politician, political activist and commentator
May Hezlet (1882–1978), British amateur golfer and sports writer
May Hollinworth (1895–1968), Australian theatre producer and director
May J. (born 1988), Japanese singer
May McAvoy (1899–1984), American actor
May W. Newburger (1920–2012), New York politician
May Robson (1858–1942), Australian actress
May Sarton (1912–1995), American poet and novelist
May Sayegh (1940–2023), Palestinian poet and activist
Lady May Abel Smith (1906–1994), a member of the British royal family
May Whitty (1865–1948), English actress

Fictional characters 
May, one of the main characters in Geoffrey Chaucer's "The Merchant's Tale"
Aunt May, Peter Parker/Spider-Man's aunt and primary caregiver
May Bellamy, girlfriend of John Dortmunder in novels by Donald E. Westlake
May Kanker, youngest of the Kanker sisters in the animated series Ed, Edd n Eddy
May Kasahara, in Haruki Murakami's novel The Wind-Up Bird Chronicle
May Lee (The King of Fighters), in The King of Fighters fighting game series
Melinda May, a S.H.I.E.L.D. agent played by Ming-Na Wen in Agents of S.H.I.E.L.D. and subsequently appearing in Marvel comics
May (Guilty Gear), a character in the Guilty Gear video game series
May (Pokémon), in Pokémon Ruby, Sapphire, Emerald, Omega Ruby, and Alpha Sapphire, as well as the anime series
May, in the show Sid the Science Kid

See also 
 Mary
 Mei (given name), also spelled as May
 Mae (given name)

References 

English feminine given names
Hypocorisms